Helmer Hermandsen (1 February 1871 in Løten – 19 March 1958 in Brumunddal) was a Norwegian sport shooter who competed in the early 20th century in rifle shooting.

He participated in Shooting at the 1900 Summer Olympics in Paris and won the silver medal with the Norwegian Military Rifle team. In the same Olympics he also participated in the following events:

 military rifle, standing - ninth place
 military rifle, prone - tenth place
 individual rifle, three positions - 13th place
 military rifle, kneeling - 13th place

References

External links
 

1871 births
1958 deaths
People from Løten
Norwegian male sport shooters
ISSF rifle shooters
Olympic shooters of Norway
Shooters at the 1900 Summer Olympics
Olympic silver medalists for Norway
Olympic medalists in shooting
Medalists at the 1900 Summer Olympics